sn-Glycerol 1-phosphate is the conjugate base of a phosphoric ester of glycerol.  It is a component of ether lipids, which are common for archaea.

Biosynthesis and metabolism 
Glycerol 1-phosphate is synthesized by reducing dihydroxyacetone phosphate (DHAP), a  glycolysis intermediate, with sn-glycerol-1-phosphate dehydrogenase. DHAP and thus glycerol 1-phosphate is also possible to be synthesized from amino acids and citric acid cycle intermediates via gluconeogenesis pathway.
 + NAD(P)H + H+ →  + NAD(P)+

Glycerol 1-phosphate is a starting material for de novo synthesis of ether lipids, such as those derived from archaeol and caldarchaeol. It is first geranylgeranylated on its sn-3 position by a cytosolic enzyme, phosphoglycerol geranylgeranyltransferase.  A second geranylgeranyl group is then added on the sn-2 position making unsaturated archaetidic acid.

Enantiomer 
Organisms other than archaea, i.e. bacteria and eucarya, use the enantiomer, glycerol 3-phosphate for producing their cell membranes.

Notes 

Organophosphates
Phosphate esters